The Chief of Defence Force  (CDF) is the appointment held by the professional head of the New Zealand Defence Force. The post has existed under its present name since 1991. From 1963 to 1991 the head of the New Zealand Defence Force was known as the Chief of Defence Staff. All the incumbents have held three-star rank. The current Chief of Defence Force is Air Marshal Kevin Short.

Role
The CDF is the professional head of the defence forces and serves as the principal military advisor to the government. They are responsible for directing the chiefs of service and ensuring morale. The CDF also serves as the chief executive of the defence force, thereby being the person with sole accountability to the government and people of New Zealand.

Appointees
The following list chronologically records those who have held the post of Chief of Defence Force or its preceding positions, with rank and honours as at the completion of the individual's term.

|-style="text-align:center;"
|colspan=7|Chief of Defence Staff

|-style="text-align:center;"
|colspan=7|Chief of Defence Force

References

 
New Zealand